This was the first edition of the tournament.

Paula Badosa won her first WTA singles title without dropping a set throughout the entire tournament, after Ana Konjuh retired from the final with the scoreline at 6–2, 2–0.

This was Konjuh’s first tour-level final since 2017 ASB Classic tournament following her comeback from injury.

Seeds

Draw

Finals

Top half

Bottom half

Qualifying

Seeds

Qualifiers

Lucky loser

Qualifying draw

First qualifier

Second qualifier

Third qualifier

Fourth qualifier

Fifth qualifier

Sixth qualifier

References

External links
 Main draw
 Qualifying draw

2021 WTA Tour
2021 Serbia Open – Women's 1